Kristof Van Hout (born 9 February 1987) is a Belgian professional footballer who plays as a goalkeeper for Lommel. With a height of 2.08 m, he is considered one of the tallest footballers in history.

Career 
Van Hout joined Willem II in 2004 from Verbroedering Geel as a youth player. On 6 August 2009, Standard Liège signed him from Kortrijk on a three-year deal. On 11 June 2011, he returned to Kortrijk on a one-year contract.

On 23 May 2022, Van Hout signed a one-season contract with Lommel.

Honours 
Genk
Belgian Cup: 2012–13

Notes 

1987 births
Living people
People from Lommel
Belgian footballers
Belgian Pro League players
Challenger Pro League players
K.F.C. Lommel S.K. players
Willem II (football club) players
K.V. Kortrijk players
Standard Liège players
K.R.C. Genk players
Odisha FC players
K.V.C. Westerlo players
Lommel S.K. players
Eredivisie players
Belgian expatriate footballers
Expatriate footballers in the Netherlands
Expatriate footballers in India
Belgian expatriate sportspeople in the Netherlands
Belgian expatriate sportspeople in India
Association football goalkeepers
Footballers from Limburg (Belgium)